Elon Musk's Tesla Roadster is an electric sports car that served as the dummy payload for the February 2018 Falcon Heavy test flight and became an artificial satellite of the Sun. A mannequin in a spacesuit, dubbed "Starman", occupies the driver's seat. The car and rocket are products of Tesla and SpaceX, respectively, both companies headed by Elon Musk. The 2010 Roadster is personally owned by and previously used by Musk for commuting to work. It is the first production car launched into space.

The car, mounted on the rocket's second stage, acquired enough velocity to escape Earth's gravity and enter an elliptical heliocentric orbit crossing the orbit of Mars. During the early portion of the voyage outside the Earth's atmosphere, live video was transmitted back to the mission control center and live-streamed for slightly over four hours.

Advertising analysts noted Musk's sense of brand management and use of new media for his decision to launch a Tesla into space. Musk explained he wanted to inspire the public about the "possibility of something new happening in space" as part of his larger vision for spreading humanity to other planets.

Background 

In March 2017, SpaceX's founder, Elon Musk, said that because the launch of the new Falcon Heavy vehicle was risky, it would carry the "silliest thing we can imagine". In June 2017, one of his Twitter followers suggested that the silly thing be a Tesla Model S, to which Musk replied "Suggestions welcome!". In December 2017 he announced that the payload would be his personal "midnight cherry Tesla Roadster".

One of the test flight objectives was to demonstrate that the new rocket could carry a payload as far as the orbit of Mars. NASA had declined SpaceX's offer to carry whatever payload they wanted and the Roadster was a backup option.

The Roadster is the first standard roadworthy vehicle sent into space, following several special-purpose lunar and Mars rovers.

Roadster as payload  

The car was permanently mounted on the rocket in an inclined position above the payload adapter. Tubular structures were added to mount front and side cameras. Photos of the car prior to payload encapsulation were released.

Positioned in the driver's seat is "Starman", a full-scale human mannequin clad in a SpaceX pressure spacesuit. It was placed with the right hand on the steering wheel and the left elbow resting on the open window sill.  The mannequin was named after the David Bowie song "Starman", and the car's sound system was set before launch to continuously loop the Bowie song "Space Oddity".

There is a copy of Douglas Adams' novel The Hitchhiker's Guide to the Galaxy in the glovebox, along with references to the book in the form of a towel and a sign on the dashboard that reads "DON'T PANIC!". A Hot Wheels miniature Roadster with a miniature Starman is mounted on the dashboard. A plaque bearing the names of the employees who worked on the project is placed underneath the car, and a message on the vehicle's circuit board reads "Made on Earth by humans". The car also carries a copy of Isaac Asimov's Foundation trilogy on a 5D optical disc, a proof of concept for high-density long-lasting data storage, donated to Musk by the Arch Mission Foundation.

Trajectory

The US Office of Commercial Space Transportation issued the test flight's launch license on February 2, 2018. The rocket lifted off from Launch Complex 39A at Kennedy Space Center at 15:45 EST (20:45 UTC) on February 6. The upper stage supporting the car was initially placed in an Earth parking orbit. It spent six hours coasting through the Van Allen radiation belts, thereby demonstrating a new capability requested by the U.S. Air Force for direct insertion of heavy intelligence satellites into geostationary orbit. Then, the upper stage performed a second boost to reach the desired escape trajectory.

The launch was live streamed, and video feeds from space showed the Roadster at various angles, with Earth in the background, thanks to cameras placed inside and outside the car, on booms attached to the vehicle's custom adaptor atop the upper stage. Musk had estimated the car's battery would last over 12 hours, but the live stream ran for just over four hours, thus ending before the final boost out of Earth orbit. The images were released by SpaceX into the public domain on their Flickr account.

Following the launch, the rocket stage carrying the car was given the Satellite Catalog Number 43205, named "TESLA ROADSTER/FALCON 9H", along with the COSPAR designation 2018-017A. The JPL Horizons system publishes solutions for the trajectory as target body "-143205".

With an inclination of roughly 1 degree to the ecliptic plane, compared to Mars' 1.85° inclination, this trajectory by design cannot intercept Mars, so the car will neither fly by Mars nor enter an orbit around Mars. This was the second object launched by SpaceX to leave Earth orbit, after the DSCOVR mission to the Earth–Sun  Lagrangian point.

Even if the rocket had targeted an actual Mars transfer orbit, the car could not have been placed into orbit around Mars, because the upper stage that carries it is not equipped with the necessary propellant, maneuvering, and communications capabilities. This flight simply demonstrated that Falcon Heavy is capable of launching significant payloads towards Mars in potential future missions.

Cultural impact
The car in space quickly became a topic for Internet memes. Western Australia Police distributed a picture of a radar gun aimed at the Roadster whilst above Australia. Škoda produced a parody video of a Škoda Superb being driven to Mars (a village in central France). An attempt was made by Donut Media to launch a Hot Wheels Tesla Model X to the stratosphere using a weather balloon. ToSky, a Russian start-up, sent a scale model of a Soviet-era Lada carrying a mannequin of Roscosmos head Dmitry Rogozin to an altitude of 20 km (12 miles) to gather test data for the design of stratostats.

Some news reports observed a similarity between the real pictures of a car orbiting the Earth and the title sequence of the 1981 animation film Heavy Metal, where a space traveler lands on Earth in a two-seater Chevrolet Corvette convertible.

The SpaceX launch live stream reached over 2.3 million concurrent viewers on YouTube, which made it the second most watched live event on the platform, behind another space-related event: Felix Baumgartner's jump from the stratosphere in 2012.

Reactions 
The choice of the Roadster as a dummy payload was variously interpreted as marketing for Tesla, or a work of art, with some worrying about the risk to contamination of otherwise sterile solar system bodies. Some also commented on how the Roadster was not a space debris risk.

Marketing 
Musk was lauded as a visionary marketer and brand manager by controlling both the timing and the content of his corporate public relations. After the launch, Scientific American said using a car was not entirely pointless, in the sense that something of that size and weight was necessary for a meaningful test. "Thematically, it was a perfect fit" to use the Tesla car, and there was no reason not to take the opportunity to remind the auto industry that Musk was challenging the status quo in that arena, as well as in space. Advertising Age agreed with Business Insider that the Roadster space launch was the "greatest ever car commercial without a dime spent on advertising", demonstrating that Musk is "miles ahead of the rest" in reaching young consumers, where "mere mortals scrabble about spending millions to fight each other over seconds of air time", Musk "just executes his vision." Alex Hern, technology reporter for The Guardian, said the choice to launch a car was a "hybrid of genuine breakthrough and nerd-baiting publicity stunt" without "any real point beyond generating good press pics", which should not detract from the much more important technological milestone represented by the launch of the rocket itself.

Lori Garver, a former NASA deputy director, initially said the choice of payload for the Falcon Heavy maiden flight is a gimmick and a loss of opportunity to further advance science—but later clarified that "I was told by a SpaceX VP (vice president) at the launch that they offered free launches to NASA, Air Force etc. but got no takers."

Musk responded to the critics stating he wanted to inspire the public about the "possibility of something new happening in space," as part of his larger vision for spreading humanity to other planets.

Work of art 

The Verge likened the Roadster to a "ready-made" work of art, such as Marcel Duchamp's 1917 piece Fountain, created by placing an everyday object in an unusual position, context and orientation.

Alice Gorman, a lecturer in archaeology and space studies at Flinders University in Australia, said that the Roadster's primary purpose is symbolic communication, that "the red sports car symbolises masculinity – power, wealth and speed – but also how fragile masculinity is." Drawing on anthropological theories of symbols, she argues that "The car is also an armour against dying, a talisman that quells a profound fear of mortality." Gorman wrote that "the spacesuit is also about death. [...] The Starman was never alive, but now he's haunting space."

Space debris non-risk 
Orbital debris expert Darren McKnight stated that the car poses no risk because it is far from Earth orbit. He added: "The enthusiasm and interest that [Musk] generates more than offsets the infinitesimally small 'littering' of the cosmos." Tommy Sanford, director of the Commercial Spaceflight Federation, said that the car and its rocket stage are no more "space junk" than the mundane material usually launched on other test flights. Mass simulators are often deliberately placed in a graveyard orbit or sent on a deep space trajectory, where they are not a hazard.

Bacteriological contamination 

The Planetary Society was concerned that launching a non-sterile object to interplanetary space may risk biological contamination of a foreign world. Scientists at Purdue University noted that the vehicle will be sterilized by solar radiation over time and the vehicle is most likely to hit the Earth in the future, though some bacteria might survive on some components of the vehicle which could contaminate Mars in the distant future if it was to hit Mars instead.

Orbit tracking  
The car and the upper stage were passivated by intentionally removing remaining chemical and electrical energy, at which point they ceased transmitting telemetry. Based on optical observations made using a robotic telescope at the Warrumbungle Observatory, Dubbo, Australia and refinement of the orbit, a close re-encounter with Earth (originally predicted for 2073) is not possible.

The Virtual Telescope Project observed the Tesla two days after its launch, where it had a magnitude of 15.5, comparable to Pluto's moon Charon. The Roadster was automatically spotted and logged by the Asteroid Terrestrial-impact Last Alert System (ATLAS) telescope operated by the University of Hawaii.

Through measuring changes in apparent brightness of the object, astronomers have determined that the Roadster is rotating with a period of 4.7589 ± 0.0060 minutes (i.e. 4 minutes, 46 seconds). By February 11, 2018, astrometry measurements from 241 independent observations had been collated, refining the positions to within one-tenth of an arcsecond and published by the SeeSat-L mailing list, a group of amateur satellite spotters—more accurate than for most observations of objects in space.

Future predictions 
Simulations over a 3-million-year timespan found a probability of the Roadster colliding with Earth at approximately 6%, or with Venus at approximately 2.5%. These probabilities of collision are similar to those of other near-Earth objects. The half-life for the tested orbits was calculated as approximately 20 million years, but with trajectories varying significantly following a close approach to the Earth–Moon system in 2091.

Musk had originally speculated that the car could drift in space for a billion years. According to chemist William Carroll, solar radiation, cosmic radiation, and micrometeoroid impacts will structurally damage the car over time. Radiation will eventually break down any material with carbon–carbon bonds, including carbon fiber parts. Tires, paint, plastic and leather might have lasted only about a year, while carbon fiber parts will last considerably longer. Eventually, only the aluminum frame, inert metals, and glass not shattered by meteoroids will remain.

Potential follow up mission 
In August 2019, as the Roadster completed its first orbit around the Sun, Musk stated that SpaceX may one day launch a small spacecraft or Starship to catch up with the Roadster and take photographs or even return it to Earth for studying solar erosion on it just as Apollo 12 did with Surveyor 3 lander's components.

See also 

 List of artificial objects in heliocentric orbit
 List of passive satellites

References

External links

Real-time 
Trajectory animation, past and future events, orbital elements.
 
 

Individual cars
Tesla, Inc. vehicles
Tesla Roadster
Derelict satellites in heliocentric orbit
Message artifacts
Spacecraft launched in 2018
Spacecraft launched by Falcon rockets
Found object
Publicity stunts
Cars launched into space